55 Faulkner Street (also 18 Nicholas Street) is a historic building in the Chinatown district of Manchester, United Kingdom. Constructed in 1870, and Grade II listed in June 1994, it caught fire and was gutted in November 2016.

Building 
Located in Chinatown, Manchester, close to Manchester's Chinese Arch, 55 Faulkner Street was originally constructed as a warehouse in 1870 by Clegg and Knowles. It is a rectangular corner building with a basement and four floors, with five bays facing Nicholas Street and three bays facing Faulkner Street. It was built of brown bricks with Flemish bond and sandstone dressings. It was later used as offices, and became a Grade II listed building on 6 June 1994.

Fire 

In the early hours of 25 November 2016, around 2.15am, the building caught fire. Over 50 firefighters were involved in extinguishing the fire. The building was gutted by the fire, with the roof collapsing in, and the building was deemed structurally unsafe. Staircases in the building had to be shored up before the remains of the building could be explored. The cause of the fire has not been established. No other buildings in the area were damaged.

The bodies of two men, James Evans and Wayne Bardsley, were recovered from the first floor of the building after the fire, thought to be homeless people, which sparked outcry amongst homeless charities and members of parliament about homelessness in Manchester. The building was known to have housed homeless people in the past, as the building had been unoccupied for some time. The police and fire service are running a joint investigation of the fire, and an arrest connected with the fire was made on 8 December 2016.

Conversion 
In January 2018 it was announced that the building will be converted into flats, with a restaurant on the ground floor.

References 

Grade II listed buildings in Manchester
2016 fires in the United Kingdom
2016 in England